Carmen Alonso (born 15 July 1984) is a Spanish professional golfer and member of the Ladies European Tour (LET).

Amateur career
Alonso played on the national team and in 2000 won the European Young Masters both individually and with Spain, as Rafa Cabrera-Bello won the boys' category. She won gold at the 2001 Mediterranean Games and finished 5th at the 2000 Espirito Santo Trophy together with Tania Elósegui and Marta Prieto. She was part of the Spanish juggernaut that won the European Lady Junior's Team Championship in 2002 and 2004, and the European Ladies' Team Championship in 2003.

Alonso played in the European Junior Solheim Cup team in 2002 and won the Junior Ryder Cup with the European team in 1999 and 2002.

She won the 2000 French Ladies Amateur and in 2001 she was runner-up at the Girls Amateur Championship and reached the semi-final of The Womens Amateur Championship.

Professional career
Alonso turned professional in late 2004 after she finished T30 at the Ladies European Tour Qualifying School. In 2006, she recorded her first top-10 finishes, T7 at both the Open de España Femenino and the Ladies English Open. In 2008, she was runner-up at the Ladies Italian Open.

In 2005, Alonso played on the Nedbank Women's Golf Tour in South Africa and recorded a T3 at the Telkom Women's Classic, and 2nd at the Nedbank Women's Masters after she lost a playoff to Maria Beautell. She played in the 2009 Women's British Open at Royal Lytham & St Annes Golf Club and made the cut.

In 2010, her sixth season on the LET, she led the LET statistics for average driving distance with an average drive of 287.85 yards.

Alonso won her first professional title on the LET Access Series at the 2018 AXA Czech Ladies Challenge. She was runner-up at the 2019 Santander Golf Tour LETAS Valencia, one stroke behind Manon De Roey.

In 2021, she recorded a T4 at the Creekhouse Ladies Open and in the team event of the Aramco Team Series – London she formed the runner-up team together with Marianne Skarpnord and Frida Gustafsson Spång.

Amateur wins 
2000 European Young Masters (individual), French International Ladies Amateur Championship
2001 Sherry Cup

Source:

Professional wins (1)

LET Access Series (1)

Team appearances
Amateur
European Young Masters (representing Spain): 2000 (winners)
Junior Ryder Cup (representing the Continent of Europe): 1999 (winners), 2002 (winners)
Junior Solheim Cup (representing the Continent of Europe): 2002
Espirito Santo Trophy (representing Spain): 2000
European Lady Junior's Team Championship (representing Spain): 2002 (winners), 2004 (winners)
European Ladies' Team Championship (representing Spain): 2001, 2003 (winners)

References

External links

Spanish female golfers
Ladies European Tour golfers
Mediterranean Games gold medalists for Spain
Mediterranean Games medalists in golf
Competitors at the 2001 Mediterranean Games
Sportspeople from Valladolid
1984 births
Living people
20th-century Spanish women
21st-century Spanish women